A love letter is a romantic way to express feelings of love in written form.

Love Letter(s) or The Love Letter may also refer to:

Film and television

Film 
 Love Letters (1917 film), an American drama silent film
 Love Letters (1924 film), an American melodrama film directed by David Selman (as David Soloman)
 Love Letters (1945 film), an American film directed by William Dieterle
 Love Letters (1984 film), an American film starring Jamie Lee Curtis
 Love Letters (1999 film), an American television film directed by Stanley Donen
 Love Letter (1953 film), a Japanese film directed by Kinuyo Tanaka
 Love Letter (1959 film), a Japanese film directed by Seijun Suzuki
 Love Letter (1975 film), a Malayalam film
 Love Letter (1985 film), a Japanese film directed by Tatsumi Kumashiro
 Love Letter (1995 film), a Japanese film directed by Shunji Iwai
 Love Letter (1998 film), a Japanese film starring Mitsuko Baisho
 The Love Letter (1998 film), a Hallmark Hall of Fame television film directed by Dan Curtis
 The Love Letter (1999 film), an American romantic comedy directed by Peter Chan

Television 
 Love Letter (TV series), a 2003 Korean television drama
 Love Letter (variety show), a 2004–2006 Korean television variety show
 "Love Letters", an episode of Steven Universe

Music

Albums 
 Love Letter (Ai Otsuka album), and the title song, 2008
 Love Letter (Azu album), and the title song, 2012
 Love Letter (Gackt album), and the title song (see below), 2005
 Love Letter (Jessie Farrell album), and the title song, 2011
 Love Letter (Miyuki Nakajima album), and the title song, 2003
 Love Letter (R. Kelly album), and the title song, 2010
 Love Letter (Sajjad Ali album), and the title song, 1990
 Love Letter (3776 album), 2014
 Love Letters (Julie London album), and the title song, 1962
 Love Letters (Leslie Satcher album), 2002
 Love Letters (Metronomy album), 2014
 Love Letters (The Boss album), 2012
Love Letters, album by André Rieu
Love Letters, album by William Galison

Songs 
 "Love Letter" (Berry Good song), 2014
 "Love Letter" (BoA song), 2007
 "Love Letter" (Gackt song), 2006
 "Love Letter" (Nick Cave and the Bad Seeds song), 2001
 "Love Letters" (song), by Dick Haymes in the 1945 film (see above); covered by Ketty Lester (1961) and Alison Moyet (1987)
 "Loveletter" (Yoasobi song), 2021
 "Love Letter", by the Blue Hearts from Train-Train
 "Love Letter", by Bonnie Raitt from Nick of Time
 "Love Letter", by Julie Ruin (Kathleen Hanna) from Julie Ruin
 "Love Letter", by Leona Lewis from Echo
 "Love Letter", by Loona from JinSoul
 "Love Letter", by Nina Nesbitt from The Sun Will Come Up, the Seasons Will Change
 "Love Letter", by Shinhwa from Winter Story
 "Love Letter", by Shwayze
 "Love Letter", by Stan Rogers from From Coffee House to Concert Hall, 1999
 "Love Letters", by Miranda Lambert from Crazy Ex-Girlfriend

Others 
 Sapit, a traditional kueh, also known as love letters
 Biscuit roll, a crunchy and brittle biscuit snack, also known as love letters
 The Love Letter (Vermeer), a painting by Johannes Vermeer
 Love Letters (play), a 1988 play by A. R. Gurney
 Love Letters (novel), by Katie Fforde
 The Love Letters (novel) or Love Letters, a 1966 novel by Madeleine L'Engle
 LoveLetter or ILOVEYOU, a 2000 computer worm
 Love Letter (card game), a 2012 card game of Japanese origin